Classic Haribo was a professional cycle road race held between Uzès and Marseille, in south France. In 2005 and 2006 the race was organised as a 1.1 event on the UCI Europe Tour, also being part of the Coupe de France de cyclisme sur route.

Winners

References

External links
 Haribo sport 

Defunct cycling races in France
Cycle races in France
UCI Europe Tour races
Recurring sporting events established in 1994
1994 establishments in France
Recurring sporting events disestablished in 2006
2006 disestablishments in France